Ursula Wolf (born 4 November 1951 in Karlsruhe) is a German philosophy professor and writer.

Biography
She has been philosophy teacher at the Free University of Berlin, at the University of Frankfurt, and, now, at the University of Mannheim, where she holds a full professorship in that specialty.

In some of her work, Ursula Wolf argues for animal rights. Talking about animal testing, she argues that the fact that something can be useful for human beings or that is legal doesn't make it ethically right. She also criticizes the German Animal Protection Law that according to her has double standards because it says on the one hand that humans have moral obligations towards nonhuman animals, and on the other that these obligations disappear when it comes to investigation using animals.

Selected works
 Das Tier in der Moral. Vittorio Klosterman, 1990
 Platons Frühdialoge. Rowohlt, 1996
 Die Philosophie und die Frage nach dem guten Leben. Rowohlt, Reinbek bei Hamburg 1999,

See also
 List of animal rights advocates

References

1951 births
20th-century German non-fiction writers
20th-century German philosophers
20th-century German women writers
Bioethicists
German animal rights scholars
Living people
Academic staff of the University of Mannheim
Writers from Karlsruhe